T. H. B. Dawson House is a historic home located at Berkeley Springs, Morgan County, West Virginia.  It was built in 1880 and is an "L"-shaped, two-story, brick house with highly ornate porches at the front and side elevations. It features Gothic Revival and Italianate decorative elements. The house was built for T. H. B. (Thomas Hart Benton) Dawson (1840-1921), a native of Berkeley Springs who attained prominence in community service and business affairs.  It 1866, he was elected county clerk of Morgan County and held that position for 36 years.

It was listed on the National Register of Historic Places in 1983.  It is located within the Town of Bath Historic District, listed on the National Register of Historic Places in 2009.

References

External links

Bath (Berkeley Springs), West Virginia
Houses on the National Register of Historic Places in West Virginia
Gothic Revival architecture in West Virginia
Italianate architecture in West Virginia
Houses completed in 1880
Houses in Morgan County, West Virginia
National Register of Historic Places in Morgan County, West Virginia
Individually listed contributing properties to historic districts on the National Register in West Virginia